Alstrom Point is a 4,685-foot (1,428 meter) elevation landmark located in Glen Canyon National Recreation Area, in Kane County of southern Utah. This iconic landmark of the Lake Powell area is a cape that extends south into Lake Powell between Padre Bay and Warm Creek Bay. Alstrom Point rises nearly 1,000 feet above the lake when it's full. It is composed primarily of Entrada Sandstone, similar to Romana Mesa immediately south, and Gunsight Butte  to the east. The Entrada Sandstone is overlain by Romana Sandstone, and capped by Morrison Formation. The Entrada Sandstone, which was originally deposited as sandy mud on a tidal flat, is believed to have formed about 160 million years ago during the Jurassic period as a giant sand sea, the largest in Earth's history. 

Alstrom Point is an excellent photography and camping spot. It briefly appears in the 1968 film Planet of the Apes. It has been used as a location for music videos such as Michael Bolton's Said I Loved You...But I Lied and Britney Spears' I'm Not a Girl, Not Yet a Woman.

According to the Köppen climate classification system, Alstrom Point is located in an arid climate zone with hot, very dry summers, and chilly winters with very little snow.

This geographical feature's toponym was officially adopted in 1986 by the U.S. Board on Geographic Names.


See also
 Colorado Plateau

Gallery

References

External links
 Weather forecast: National Weather Service

Colorado Plateau
Landforms of Kane County, Utah
Glen Canyon National Recreation Area
Lake Powell